Francesca Segarelli (born 5 September 1990) is a Dominican former professional tennis player.

Segarelli won eight doubles titles on the ITF Circuit in her career. On 15 June 2015, she reached her best singles ranking of world No. 424. On 2 November 2015, she peaked at No. 342 in the doubles rankings.

Since her debut for the Dominican Republic Fed Cup team in 2005, Segarelli has accumulated a win–loss record of 27–15 in international competition.

ITF Circuit finals

Singles (0–1)

Doubles (8–4)

References

External links

 
 
 

1990 births
Living people
Tennis players from Rome
Dominican Republic female tennis players
Dominican Republic people of Italian descent
Florida State Seminoles women's tennis players
Tennis players at the 2015 Pan American Games
Pan American Games competitors for the Dominican Republic
Central American and Caribbean Games silver medalists for the Dominican Republic
Central American and Caribbean Games bronze medalists for the Dominican Republic
Competitors at the 2010 Central American and Caribbean Games
Competitors at the 2014 Central American and Caribbean Games
Central American and Caribbean Games medalists in tennis
White Dominicans